José de Armas (born March 25, 1981, in Florida) is a former Venezuelan professional tennis player.

De Armas reached a career high ATP singles ranking of World No. 236, achieved on 19 May, 2003. Additionally he reached a career high ATP doubles ranking of World No. 231, achieved on 14 August, 2000.

Juniors

During his time as a junior, De Armas achieved doubles success on clay, and would go on to win the Junior Boys' Doubles championships at the French Open in both 1997 and 1998.

Junior Grand Slam finals

Doubles: 2 (2 titles)

ATP Challenger and ITF Futures finals

Singles: 32 (22–10)

Doubles: 14 (10–4)

References

External links
 
 

1981 births
Living people
American sportspeople of Venezuelan descent
French Open junior champions
Tennis players from Caracas
Sportspeople from Florida
Tennis players at the 2000 Summer Olympics
Tennis players at the 2003 Pan American Games
Venezuelan male tennis players
Venezuelan people of American descent
Pan American Games bronze medalists for Venezuela
Pan American Games medalists in tennis
Central American and Caribbean Games gold medalists for Venezuela
Central American and Caribbean Games silver medalists for Venezuela
Competitors at the 2010 Central American and Caribbean Games
Grand Slam (tennis) champions in boys' doubles
Olympic tennis players of Venezuela
Central American and Caribbean Games medalists in tennis
Medalists at the 2003 Pan American Games